Xinzheng Airport railway station is an underground railway station on Zhengzhou–Xinzheng Airport Intercity Railway in Zhengzhou, Henan, China.

The English name of the station is Xinzhengjichang ("jichang" is the pinyin of "机场", which stands for "airport") in the ticket system while the signs in the station show the English name as Xinzheng Airport.

Station layout
The station is located on the basement floors of the ground traffic center (GTC) of Zhengzhou Xinzheng International Airport, together with the Xinzheng International Airport station of Zhengzhou Metro. The station entrance, waiting hall and ticket offices are on the B2 floor and platforms are on the B3 floor.

The station has 4 platforms (2 island platforms): Platform 1 and 3 are in the north and Platform 2 and 4 are in the south.

References

Railway stations in Henan
Railway stations in Zhengzhou
Stations on the Zhengzhou–Xinzheng Airport Intercity Railway
Railway stations in China opened in 2015
Airport railway stations in China